Thomas Chapman may refer to:

 Thomas Chapman (actor) (1683–1747), British stage actor
 Tom Chapman (born 1972), French-English musician
 Thomas Chapman (Australian politician) (1815–1884), Premier of Tasmania
 Thomas Chapman (bishop) (1867–1949), Anglican bishop
 Thomas Chapman (Master of Magdalene College) (1717–1760), English churchman and academic
 Sir Thomas Chapman, 2nd Baronet, Irish landowner
 Sir Thomas Chapman, 7th Baronet (1846–1919), Anglo-Irish landowner
 Thomas Chapman (footballer) (1871–1929), English footballer
 Thomas Chapman (cricketer) (1918–1979), English cricketer
 Thomas Algernon Chapman (1842–1921), Scottish entomologist
 Thomas Howard Chapman, Director of Public Works of Ceylon and acting Commander of the Ceylon Defence Force
 Thomas Chapman (MP) (1663–?), British lawyer and politician

See also
Chapman (surname)